Abadie may refer to:

 Abadie (surname)
 Abadie, on List of rolling papers
 Abadie's sign, a spasm of the levator palpebrae superioris muscle
 Abadie's symptom, an eponymous medical sign

See also